Subclass Spiruria comprises mostly parasitic secernentean nematodes. In an alternate classification, they are treated as suborder Spirurina, with the orders listed here being ranked as infraorders.

Spiruria contain divirese group of worms that inhabit soil, water, and other bodies of organism. The subclass of Spiruria has a specialized structure called stoma, which ingests fluid from its host's tissue. 

The Ascaridida and the  Oxyurida, which include worms that infect many mammals (including marine mammals), are sometimes placed in subclass Rhabditia. But that seems as spurious as the erstwhile placement of the Rhigonematida in subclass Tylenchia. The Camallanida and Drilonematida are sometimes included in the Spirurida as suborder and superfamily, respectively.

There is a lot of ongoing debate about the taxonomy of Spiruria. Some place the subclass Ascaridia and Oxyurida within Rhabditia subclass.

Some important species 
Giant roundworm (Ascaris lumbricoides), causes ascariasis in humans 
Toxocara canis, parasite of dogs
Anisakis, responsible for the human disease Anisakiasis

Footnotes

References 

  (2002): Nematoda. Version of 2002-JAN-01. Retrieved 2008-NOV-02.
 Bowman, D. D. (2014). Georgis' parasitology for veterinarians. Elsevier Health Sciences.
 Hawdon, J. M., & Schad, G. A. (1990). Trichinella and trichinosis. Oxford University Press.

 
Parasitic nematodes of mammals
Protostome subclasses